The 1974 NCAA Division I basketball tournament involved 25 schools playing in single-elimination play to determine the national champion of men's  NCAA Division I college basketball. It was the first tournament to be designated as a Division I championship—previously, NCAA member schools had been divided into the "University Division" and "College Division". The NCAA created its current three-division setup, effective with the 1973–74 academic year, by moving all of its University Division schools to Division I and splitting the College Division members into Division II (fewer scholarships) and Division III (no athletic scholarships allowed). Previous tournaments would retroactively be considered Division I championships.

The tournament began on March 9, 1974, and ended with the championship game on March 25 in Greensboro, North Carolina. Until 2019, when Virginia defeated Texas Tech, it was the last tournament in which neither school had previously appeared in any national championship game (5 years later Michigan State would defeat Indiana St in each school's inaugural Division I National Finals, but Indiana State had previously contested and lost finals in the NAIA national championships and the NCAA Division II National Championships). A total of 29 games were played, including a third-place game in each region and a national third-place game.

North Carolina State, coached by Norm Sloan, won the national title with a 76–64 victory in the final game over Marquette, coached by Al McGuire. This result ended UCLA's record streak of seven consecutive titles. David Thompson of North Carolina State was named the tournament's Most Outstanding Player.

This was the final year that only conference champions and independents could participate in the tournament. During the same time in 1974, the Collegiate Commissioners' Association held a tournament in St. Louis, Missouri. They invited the second-place teams from eight conferences to participate. In 1975, the NCAA would expand the field to include at-large bids for conference runners-up.

Tournament notes
The UCLA – North Carolina State semifinal game made USA Todays list of the greatest NCAA tournament games of all time at #13.  UCLA star Bill Walton calls that game the most disappointing outcome of his entire basketball career, given how UCLA lost a 5-point lead late in regulation and a 7-point lead in the 2nd overtime, before NC State rallied to win, 80–77. The game, played in Greensboro, was like a home game for the Wolfpack; UCLA had defeated NC State by 18 points in a neutral site game in St. Louis (where UCLA defeated Memphis State the previous March to win its seventh consecutive national championship) earlier in the season.

The Wolfpack became the fifth team in history to win the national championship playing in its home state. CCNY won the 1950 NCAA championship (as well as the NIT championship) at Madison Square Garden in New York City, Kentucky won the 1958 championship at Freedom Hall in Louisville, and UCLA won both the 1968 and 1972 championships at the Los Angeles Memorial Sports Arena.  UCLA also would win the 1975 championship in its home state, at the San Diego Sports Arena.  No team has accomplished the feat since then, although the Kansas Jayhawks won the 1988 championship in nearby Kansas City, Missouri, at Kemper Arena, which is closer to the KU campus in Lawrence, Kansas than Greensboro is to Raleigh.  
  
This was the last Sweet Sixteen appearance for Creighton and Oral Roberts  until the 2021 tournament, when both teams returned for the first time in 47 years.

Thanks in large part to the reclassification of Division I, the 1974 tournament is the last tournament to include a team no longer in Division I. The Cal State Los Angeles Golden Eagles spent one year in the modern Division I, winning the Pacific Coast Athletic Association before dropping to Division II.

Schedule and venues
The following are the sites that were selected to host each round of the 1974 tournament:

First round
March 9
East Region
 Alumni Hall, Jamaica, New York
 WVU Coliseum, Morgantown, West Virginia
 The Palestra, Philadelphia, Pennsylvania
Mideast Region
 Hulman Center, Terre Haute, Indiana
Midwest Region
 UNT Coliseum, Denton, Texas
West Region
 ASISU Minidome, Pocatello, Idaho

Regional semifinals, 3rd-place games, and finals (Sweet Sixteen and Elite Eight)
March 14 and 16
East Regional, Reynolds Coliseum, Raleigh, North Carolina
Mideast Regional, Memorial Coliseum, Tuscaloosa, Alabama
Midwest Regional, Mabee Center, Tulsa, Oklahoma
West Regional, McKale Center, Tucson, Arizona

National semifinals, 3rd-place game, and championship (Final Four and championship)
March 23 and 25
Greensboro Memorial Coliseum, Greensboro, North Carolina

Teams

Bracket
* – Denotes overtime period

East region

Mideast region

Midwest region

West region

Final Four

See also
 1974 NCAA Division II basketball tournament
 1974 National Invitation Tournament
 1974 NAIA Division I men's basketball tournament
 1974 National Women's Invitation Tournament

References

NCAA Division I men's basketball tournament
Ncaa
Basketball in the Dallas–Fort Worth metroplex
NCAA Division I men's basketball tournament
NCAA Division I men's basketball tournament